Shaykh 'Abbasi (active from 1650–1684) was a Persian painter known for incorporating European and Indian influences into his illustrations, a practice later adopted by Muhammad Zaman and 'Aliquli Jabbadar. His style evolved to become more Indian as his career went on – he painted Mughal emperors and drew particularly Indian heads, using similar techniques. His work has been proposed as evidence of a cultural exchange between 17th-century Iranian artists and Golconda artists from the same time period. A total of 25 paintings have been attributed to Shaykh 'Abbasi, including illuminations from manuscripts and miniatures featuring, among other subjects, the Safavid emperors and the Madonna and Child, colored in pale, transparent tones. Given the activities of contemporaneous artists, it is highly likely that he also painted on objects made from papier-mâché that was lacquered. He trained his two sons, 'Ali Naqi and Muhammad Taqi, in the same style.

References

Iranian artists
Persian miniature painters
17th-century painters of Safavid Iran
17th-century Iranian painters